St. John's Church is a ruined church in Linaj, Shkodër County, Albania. It is a Cultural Monument of Albania.

References

Cultural Monuments of Albania
Buildings and structures in Malësi e Madhe
Church ruins in Albania